Sharman Nancy Stone (née Bawden; born 23 April 1951) is a former Australian politician who  represented Murray in the Australian House of Representatives between March 1996 and July 2016 as a member of the Liberal Party. She currently serves as the Australian Ambassador for Women and Girls after Natasha Stott Despoja stepped down from the role in late 2016.

Background
Stone was born in Pyramid Hill, Victoria, the daughter of Harvey Bawden and Nancy Chalmers. She graduated from Monash University with a Bachelor of Arts (Hons), from La Trobe University with a Master of Arts, from Hawthorn College of Advanced Education with a Graduate Diploma of Education, and was awarded a PhD by Monash. She was Manager of International Development at the University of Melbourne, Director of Communications at the Victorian Farmers Federation, and a farmer before entering politics.

Political career
Elected to federal parliament at the 1996 federal election, Stone was appointed Parliamentary Secretary to the Minister for the Environment and Heritage in October 1998. Following the re-election of the Howard Government in October 2004, she became Parliamentary Secretary to the Minister for Finance and Administration. On 27 January 2006 she was appointed Minister for Workforce Participation, succeeding Peter Dutton.

After the defeat of the Howard Government in November 2007, Stone took up the role of Shadow Minister for Environment, Heritage, the Arts and Indigenous Affairs. Following Malcolm Turnbull's defeat of Brendan Nelson for the leadership of the Liberal Party, and the retirement of Senator Chris Ellison, Stone became Shadow Minister for Immigration and Citizenship in the subsequent reshuffle. Stone announced her retirement from politics on 26 March 2016, which took effect from the double dissolution of the Australian Parliament on 9 May, in advance of the 2016 federal election on 2 July.

Author
Stone is an author of numerous publications on race relations, environment and geology (with Doug Stone) among others, including Aborigines in White Australia (London and Melbourne, 1974).

References

External links

La Trobe University Alumni Graduate Profiles
"Pioneer to politics by Catherine Naghten", Agora – The Magazine for La Trobe University Graduates
Ministerial Website
"The Hon Dr Sharman Stone MP", Australian Parliament House
Personal website

 

1951 births
Living people
Liberal Party of Australia members of the Parliament of Australia
Members of the Australian House of Representatives
Members of the Australian House of Representatives for Murray
Australian non-fiction writers
Monash University alumni
La Trobe University alumni
Women members of the Australian House of Representatives
Women government ministers of Australia
21st-century Australian politicians
21st-century Australian women politicians
20th-century Australian politicians
Australian diplomats
Australian women diplomats
20th-century Australian women politicians